Urusbiy is the surname of the mountain princes (Taubiy) of the Balkaria in the North Caucasus.

History 
The Urusbiy surname has its  origins in one of the representatives of the Sunshevs' surname - the Bezengi Taubies (mountain princes).

The grandson of Chepelleu, a son of Urusbiy Sunshev, left with his mother at the end of the 18th century, first to the Chegem society, where his mother came from. Having grown up and become acquainted with the neighboring Baksan gorge, he decided to leave forever. After taking his noblemen (uzdens), emcheks and serfs with their families from there, he settled in the Baksan gorge near the entrance to the gorge, near the border of the possessions of the Kabardinian princes Atazhukin, on the site called "Kamyk". Soon after the resettlement, Chepelleu received support from relatives of his mother - the Chegem princes (Taubiy). With the passage of time, the Urusbievs' surname was formed from Chepleleua and his descendants. The Urusbiy surname took the name of the father of the founder Chepleleu - Urusbiy Sunshev.

Representatives 
 Ismail Urusbiy, (1831-1888), a son of Murzakul  - Lieutenant of Russian Imperial Army.

References

External links 
Etudes about Balkaria. Urusbiev, Misost Abayev, Basiyat Shakhanov.
The Journal of the Royal Geographical Society, Volume 39 page 74
The Chromolithograph: a journal of art, decoration, and the accomplishments. page 25 
Objects from the Central Caucasus (The Koban Culture)
Karachay-Balkar aristocracy